Typhoon Cimaron was a typhoon that caused minimal impacts in the Mariana Islands and Japan in August 2018. The twenty-third depression, twenty-first named storm, eleventh severe tropical storm, and seventh typhoon of the 2018 Pacific typhoon season, Cimaron developed from a tropical depression near the Marshall Islands on August 16. The depression soon became Tropical Storm Cimaron on August 18. Cimaron gradually intensified into a typhoon on August 21, and rapidly reached its peak intensity the next day. Cimaron then weakened before making two landfalls in Japan as a Category 1 typhoon on August 23. Cimaron continued to weaken until it became an extratropical cyclone and dissipated on August 24.

Cimaron brought flash flooding to the Mariana Islands, namely Saipan. The storm then hit southern Japan as a Category 1 typhoon causing major travel disruptions along with minimal structural damage. About 33 people were injured and 3 people were swept out to sea. Agricultural damage in the country totaled JP¥3.41 billion (US$30.6 million). However, this damage was soon overshadowed by Typhoon Jebi nearly two weeks later.

Meteorological history

At 12:00 UTC on August 16, 2018, a tropical depression formed near the Marshall Islands according to the JMA. The depression gradually intensified, with the JMA upgraded it into a tropical storm by 12:00 UTC on August 18, while located north of Chuuk. That same day, the JTWC began to monitor the system as a tropical depression, giving it the tag 23W. On August 20, the JTWC began to note that the storm was growing banding features around an exposed center. Cimaron turned northwestward as it became a Category 1 typhoon on August 21. As it did so, thunderstorms began to spiral through the center. The storm strengthened into a Category 2 typhoon at 18:00 UTC that day, and a Category 3 typhoon, just a few hours later.

Soon, Cimaron shifted northward and began weakening. The storm had weakened into a Category 1 typhoon as it made its first landfall in the southern portion of Tokushima Prefecture, Japan, at 12:00 UTC then a second landfall in Himeji, Hyogo Prefecture around 14:30 UTC on August 23. Cimaron continued weakening as it turned north-northeastward, transitioning into an extratropical cyclone over the Sea of Japan at 12:00 UTC on August 24. Just 6 hours later, the extratropical remnants dissipated.

Preparations and impact
Cimaron caused heavy rainfall and flash flooding in the Mariana Islands, namely on Saipan. Cimaron then moved across southern Japan as a Category 1 typhoon bringing major travel disruptions, widespread power outages, and numerous injuries. Agricultural damage in Japan reached JP¥3.41 billion (US$30.6 million). Cimaron was the 12th typhoon to make landfall in Japan during 2018.

Mariana Islands
In the Mariana Islands, a tropical storm warning was put in effect for the islands Saipan and Tinian. Meanwhile, a hurricane warning was issued for the islands of Agrihan, Pagan, and Alamagan. 18 people stayed at 4 shelters in Saipan and Tinian, while a liaison officer was sent to the former to help response efforts. Public schools and government offices were forced to shut down on the islands of Saipan and Tinian. However, schools remained open on Rota. As Cimaron dumped several inches of rainfall over the Northern Mariana Islands, a flash flood watch was put in place for Saipan, Tinian, Alamagan, Pagan, and Agrihan. Widespread flash flooding was reported with the worst being in Saipan where numerous roads were flooded. A couple of days after Cimaron affected the Mariana Islands, the clearing of floodwaters began in Saipan.

Japan

Ahead of the storm, the JMA issued windstorm warnings in parts of Hyogo, Okayama, Wakayama, Tottori, Kagawa, Tokushima, Kochi, Ehime Oita, Miyazaki, and Kagoshima prefectures. Meanwhile, strong wind warnings were put in effect for the prefectures of Osaka, Nara, Hiroshima, Yamaguchi, Shimane, Fukuoka, Nagasaki, and Saga. The British Embassy in Japan and the Japanese Ministry of Defense announced that a beach landing drill would be cancelled due to the storm. Evacuations were ordered in Hyogo, Osaka, and Wakayama prefectures. In Kobe, around 103,550 people were ordered to evacuate. Some public transportation services were suspended on August 23. 76 flights were cancelled at the Osaka International Airport while 52 flights were cancelled at the Kansai International Airport. Ferry services connecting Shikoku and Kansai were mostly suspended on August 23.

Heavy rainfall from the storm in Wakayama Prefecture caused the Kumano River to overflow, causing fields and rice paddies to flood. On the Akashi Kaikyo Bridge in Hyogo Prefecture, 5 vehicles were blown over by gusty winds. A 60 meter tall wind turbine was toppled in Awaji. The roof of an apartment was blown away with part of it landing on a parking lot in Nishinomiya. At the Narita International Airport in Tokyo, a plane went into a nosedive while making a rough landing during the storm. Roughly 138,000 households lost electricity because of the storm. Five homes were damaged by the storm and seven other were flooded due to Cimaron. 33 people were injured due to wind-related incidents in the prefectures of Hyogo and Kyoto. 3 college students in Shizuoka died after being swept out to sea, with their belongings being found on the beach. 22 people were also injured. Agricultural damage in Kyoto, Wakayama, and Shiga prefectures totaled JP¥3.41 billion (US$30.6 million).

See also

Weather of 2018
Tropical cyclones in 2018
Typhoon Jebi (2018) — took a similar track affecting the same areas as Cimaron nearly two weeks later
Typhoon Krosa (2019) - took a similar track

References

External links

Tropical cyclones in 2018
2018 Pacific typhoon season